Trazegnies may refer to:
 Marquess of Trazegnies d'Ittre, Belgian nobility
 Trazegnies, Belgium, a place near Courcelles
 Trazegnies Castle, Courcelles